Cell and molecular biology are related fields of biology that are often combined.

 Cell biology
 Molecular biology
 Institute of Molecular and Cell Biology (disambiguation)
 GRE Biochemistry, Cell and Molecular Biology Test
 International Review of Cell and Molecular Biology
 American Journal of Respiratory Cell and Molecular Biology
 Weill Institute for Cell and Molecular Biology
 Max Planck Institute of Molecular Cell Biology and Genetics
 Molecular Biology of the Cell
 Molecular Biology of the Cell (textbook)
 Nature Reviews Molecular Cell Biology